The New Zealand Masters was a non-ranking snooker tournament staged on four occasions between 1983 and 1989 when the British circuit was in its close season. The first event was held in 1983. The 1984 event at the Kingsgate Convention Centre in Auckland, and saw Jimmy White defeat Kirk Stevens 5–3 in the final. There was a gap of four years before the final two events were held, both in the Legislative Chamber of the New Zealand Parliament. The final of the first event in 1988 was won by Stephen Hendry, defeating Mike Hallett 6–1, while the final tournament in 1989 saw Willie Thorne defeat Joe Johnson 7–4 in the final.

Winners

References

New Zealand Masters (snooker)
Snooker non-ranking competitions
Recurring sporting events established in 1984
Recurring events disestablished in 1989
Defunct snooker competitions